Brislington railway station was a railway station in Brislington, a suburb of Bristol, England.

The station on the Bristol and North Somerset Railway opened in 1873. It closed to passengers in 1959 and to goods traffic in 1963. The site is off Talbot Road, close to the junction with the A4 Bath Road, and is used as a scrap metal yard. Parts of the platforms remain in place, although no buildings survive.

References

External links

Disused railway stations in Bristol
Former Great Western Railway stations
Railway stations in Great Britain opened in 1873
Railway stations in Great Britain closed in 1959